The Martinus-Gymnasium Linz (MGL) is a public Gymnasium (High School) in Linz/Rhine, Germany. The educational establishment has more than 900 pupils (aged 11–19) and about 70 teachers. Founded over 300 years ago, the Martinus-Gymnasium is one of the oldest schools in Rhineland-Palatinate. It is named after Saint Martin of Tours who is its patron. Currently there is no headmaster but a substitutional headmaster.

History
The school was founded in 1706 as a  grammar school named Studium Martianum (later Gymnasium Martianum).

Modern Languages have been taught at the Martinus-Gymnasium since 1817. The faculty is one of oldest schools in Rhineland-Palatinate.

The changes the French Revolution had caused in Germany and Europe forced the school to close for two year but soon it was re-opened in 1817.

The first female student who graduated was mentioned in 1923.

During the Second World War the school closed again for one year (1944/45) and was used as a military hospital.

On moving to a new building in 1967, teachers, parents and students chose the name Martinus-Gymnasium.

In 1974 the school established the system of the Mainzer-Studien-Stufe (MSS).

In 2006 Martinus-Gymnasium celebrated its 300th anniversary.

Curriculum
Subjects available:

 English, French or Latin, Italian (fakultative)
 German (language and literature)
 Mathematics
 History, Politics, Geography
 Physics, Biology, Chemistry
 Religious Education or Ethics Studies
 Art,  Music
 Sports
 Philosophy (fakultative)
 Computing (fakultative)

Mainzer-Studien-Stufe (MSS)

After students have finished 10 years of school in Rhineland- Palatinate, they attend the "MSS". There, pupils have to choose three A-level classes, which are given in specific combinations. Furthermore,  six other subjects are chosen in order to legitimate for MSS. Overall, the MSS takes two and a half years, where, afterwards, pupils take their final exam in their three A- Levels, as well hold an oral exam in their fourth examination subject. The graduation known as Abitur in Germany, legitimates one to study at a university.

Extracurricular activities
Music: School Choir, Big Band, Guitar Playing

Sports: Football  (soccer), basketball,  Tabletennis,  Swimming,  Athletics,  Badminton,  Handball,  Marathon

The sport teams take part in several local competitions every year.

Others: Pupil Magazine,  Drama,  Greek,  Spanish

Exchange programs
 England: Norwich School  (King Edward VI’s Grammar School)
 USA: High School in Marietta, Georgia (every two years)
 Italy: Monticello Brianza
 France: Pornic, Collège et Lycée Privés Mixtes St.-Joseph du Loquidy

Some Facts
 School day begins at Martinus-Gymnasium at 07:55 am and can last for the higher classes until 05:15 pm (depends on schedule).
 On Friday and Tuesday school ends for everybody at 1:10pm.
 On Saturday after November 11 (Saint Martin) the lower classes organize a school celebration. One week later there is another one for the higher classes where usually local rock bands perform on stage. Both events raise money for charity projects.
 In Germany you get two school reports each year. One in January and the other one when the school year ends in June/July. The last one decides whether you passed or you have to do the year again.
 The graduating class has to finance and organize the prom night on its own. So they sell cake in school and arrange events to raise money for it.
 Every graduating class has its own motto which is usually playing with the word Abitur.
Example: Abipfiff! instead of Abpfiff! which means final whistle.

External links
Martinus-Gymnasium Homepage
 Wikipedia Germany artikle  (with picture of the school)
 Linz (Rhine) Homepage

Gymnasiums in Germany
Educational institutions established in 1706
1706 establishments in the Holy Roman Empire